Push the Heart is the fourth full-length album by American indie-rock band Devics. It was released in March 2006 under Bella Union Records.

Track listing

References

2006 albums
Bella Union albums